Elmir (Cyrillic: Елмир; Эльмир) may refer to:

 Elmir Alimzhanov (born 1986), Kazakhstani fencer
 Elmir Asani (born 1995), Serbian footballer
 Elmir Jukić (born 1971), Bosnian film director
 Elmir Kuduzović (born 1985), Bosnian footballer
 Elmir Nabiullin (born 1995), Russian footballer
 Elmir Valiyev (born 1989), a Head of the Administrative Legislation Sector of the National Assembly of the Republic of Azerbaijan

See also

Almir (given name)
 Elmar (given name)
 Elmer
 Elmira, a female given name

Bosnian masculine given names
Turkic masculine given names